Three referendums were held in Liechtenstein during 2011. The first on approving the registered partnership law was held between 17 and 19 June, and was approved by 68.8% of voters. The law went into effect on 1 September. The second was held on 18 September on allowing abortion within the first twelve weeks of pregnancy. Prince Alois had threatened to veto the result of the referendum should it have turned out in favour, but ultimately it was rejected by voters. The third was on building a new national hospital in Vaduz was held on 30 October, and was also rejected.

Registered partnership law
The registered partnership law (Lebenspartnerschaft) was passed unanimously by the Landtag of Liechtenstein in the second reading on March 16 and published on March 21, 2011. However, the group Vox Populi, led by a cousin of archbishop Wolfgang Haas, announced its intention to force a referendum. According to the constitution, the organisation had until 21 April (30 days) to collect at least 1000 signatures. Because the necessary signatures were gathered (1208 valid signatures), a referendum was held on the evening of 17 June and the morning of 19 June 2011.

Campaign
The registered partnership law was supported by the government and all parties in the Landtag, but opposed by the socially conservative advocacy group "Vox Populi" and the Roman Catholic Archdiocese of Vaduz.

New hospital
On 28 June the Landtag passed a bill approving spending 83 million francs on the construction of a national hospital in Vaduz by 14 votes to 11. A request for an advisory referendum was rejected by 12 votes to 11, but a committee gathered 2,951 signatures between 8 July and 3 August, forcing a referendum.

Results

Registered partnerships
The referendum achieved a good turnout of about 70 percent as of Friday evening because of a large majority of voters who had already used postal voting. Total turnout was 74.2 percent.

Abortion

National hospital

References

External links
Referendums homepage Government of Liechtenstein
Website of supporters of the registered partnership law 
Website of opponents of the registered partnership law 

2011 referendums
2011 in Liechtenstein
Abortion in Liechtenstein
Health in Liechtenstein
LGBT rights in Liechtenstein
Referendums in Liechtenstein
Abortion referendums